Yu Prefecture may refer to:
Yù Prefecture (蔚州), a prefecture between the 6th and 20th centuries in modern Hebei and Shanxi, China
Yú Prefecture (渝州), a prefecture between the 6th and 12th centuries in modern Chongqing, China
Yòu Prefecture or Yu Prefecture (宥州), a prefecture between the 8th and 14th centuries in modern Inner Mongolia, China

See also
Yu (disambiguation)
Yuzhou (disambiguation)